Sardinius is an extinct genus of prehistoric ray-finned fish that lived during the Campanian.

References

Myctophiformes
Late Cretaceous fish